Holts Landing may refer to:

Holts Landing, Wisconsin, an unincorporated community in Agenda, Ashland County, Wisconsin, United States
Holts Landing State Park, a state park in Delaware in the United States